National Security Department is a department of the Hong Kong Police Force established on 1 July 2020 under Hong Kong national security law (NSL) to "safeguard" the national security of China. Responsible for arresting pro-democracy politicians in the city, the National Security Department is regarded as the security police after the Hong Kong Special Branch was disbanded in 1995.

With a structure similar to the Special Branch, the National Security Department is led by a Deputy Commissioner of Police. The department may recruit professionals from outside Hong Kong "to provide assistance in the performance of duties for safeguarding national security". Besides, the department shall work with Office for Safeguarding National Security of the CPG in the HKSAR and is supervised by Committee for Safeguarding National Security of the Hong Kong Special Administrative Region.

Duties 
According to Article 17 of the NSL, the duties and functions of the department shall be:
 collecting and analysing intelligence and information concerning national security;
 planning, coordinating and enforcing measures and operations for safeguarding national security;
 investigating offences endangering national security;
 conducting counter-interference investigation and national security review;
 carrying out tasks of safeguarding national security assigned by the Committee for Safeguarding National Security of the Hong Kong Special Administrative Region; and
 performing other duties and functions necessary for the enforcement of this Law [national security law].

Power 
According to Article 43 of the NSL, the department is allowed to take the following actions:
 search of premises, vehicles, vessels, aircraft and other relevant places and electronic devices that may contain evidence of an offence;
 ordering any person suspected of having committed an offence endangering national security to surrender travel documents, or prohibiting the person concerned from leaving the Region;
 freezing of, applying for restraint order, charging order and confiscation order in respect of, and forfeiture of property used or intended to be used for the commission of the offence, proceeds of crime, or other property relating to the commission of the offence;
 requiring a person who published information or the relevant service provider to delete the information or provide assistance;
 requiring a political organisation of a foreign country or outside the mainland, Hong Kong and Macao of the People's Republic of China, or an agent of authorities or a political organisation of a foreign country or outside the mainland, Hong Kong and Macao of the People's Republic of China, to provide information;
 upon approval of the Chief Executive, carrying out interception of communications and conducting covert surveillance on a person who is suspected, on reasonable grounds, of having involved in the commission of an offence endangering national security; and
 requiring a person, who is suspected, on reasonable grounds, of having in possession information or material relevant to investigation, to answer questions and furnish such information or produce such material.

The National Security Department is given unprecedented power of bypassing Interception of Communications and Surveillance Ordinance to intercept communication of and monitor anyone suspected of endangering the national security. Warrants from courts are no longer needed for the department to search any premises with possible criminal evidence. Furthermore, the department is responsible for vetting candidates for elections after the election change imposed by the Chinese Government.

Leadership 
 Deputy Commissioner of Police (National Security)
 Edwina Lau (from 3 July 2020)
 Director of National Security, also Senior Assistant Commissioner of Police
 Frederic Choi (until 11 August 2021)
 Kan Kai-yan (from December 2021) 
 Assistant Commissioner of Police, National Security (1)
 Margaret Chiu
 Assistant Commissioner of Police, National Security (2)
 Kelvin Kong

Operations 

The National Security Department has accused and arrested dissenting voices in Hong Kong for "endangering" the national security, including pro-democracy politicians and protestors. Some websites were also reportedly banned by the department, including Hong Kong Watch.

Police in the department had to be vetted to review the allegiance and loyalty to China, non-disclosure agreements are signed also.

Senior police of the department has been sanctioned by the United States, including Edwina Lau, Frederic Choi, for their role in enforcing the NSL.

Cases

Stand News 
In December 2022, in the case against Stand News, it was revealed that officers from the National Security Department had archived 587 articles from the website, sought prosecutors' advice on 30 of them, and then discarded the remaining articles. The defense argued that a fair trial would be impossible, since evidence was destroyed.

References 

Secret police
Hong Kong Police Force
2020 establishments in Hong Kong
Hong Kong national security law
Hong Kong
Chinese intelligence agencies